Patrick Lee Trammell (July 11, 1940 – December 10, 1968) was an American college football player. He played quarterback at the University of Alabama from 1958 to 1961. In his senior season, he led the 1961 Alabama Crimson Tide football team to a perfect record of 11–0 and the national championship, and finished fifth in the voting for the Heisman Trophy. A third-generation physician, he lost a six-month battle with metastatic testicular cancer at age 28, shortly after earning his medical degree.

Early life
Trammell was born in Scottsboro, Alabama, as the middle son of a prominent local physician, Dr. Edward Lee Trammell. He quickly excelled both in athletics and academics. He wished to become a physician like his brother, father, and father's grandfather.

Trammell was the starting varsity quarterback at Scottsboro High School, where he earned All-County, All-State, All-Southern and All-American honors during his four year prep career. He broke a string of records including having thrown 5 touchdown passes in a single game, twice, and 40 touchdown passes during his high school career. He was also named most valuable basketball player in state of Alabama as a high school senior.

Playing career
Trammell's football career at the University of Alabama began in early 1958, before Bear Bryant's announcement that he planned to return to his alma mater to take over as head coach of the ailing football program. Trammell's family recalls a personal visit at the time and a 'pep talk' from Bryant saying that, "if you'll commit to Alabama, then I'll come back to Alabama." Trammell had actually planned to attend Georgia Tech, after being heavily recruited by Hall of Fame head coach Bobby Dodd but at this point, made a career-altering decision that would change the rest of his life.

Bryant's influence would once again bring the program into the national spotlight and Trammell was his first star player. Bryant had promised the team in the fall of 1958 the impossible notion that they would win a national championship within four years, if they could "stick it out", as told by team-mates Billy Neighbors, Bill Oliver and Mal Moore. This was going to be an uphill battle, as Alabama was coming off of four straight losing seasons. In 1959, when Trammell was a sophomore, he led Alabama in total offense and then led in total scoring in the 1960 season, including a win against the Fran Tarkenton-led Georgia Bulldogs. In 1961, Trammell led the team to a perfect season and a national championship, the first in 20 years for Alabama.

On December 5, 1961, at the National Football Foundation's reception in the Grand Ballroom at the Waldorf-Astoria in New York, with President John F. Kennedy attending, Bryant and Trammell accepted the MacArthur Trophy in recognition of Alabama's perfect season and national championship. The black tie event was hosted by Bob Hope and was also attended by General Douglas MacArthur, Vince Lombardi, head coach of the Green Bay Packers, Sidney L. James, the founding editor and publisher of Sports Illustrated  and dozens of other College Football Hall of Fame Inductees. (Of interest, a similar semi-fictional scene was digitally remastered in Winston Groom's film, Forrest Gump, in 1994, with President John F. Kennedy digitally morphed into the set with Tom Hanks, who played Forrest Gump, a celebrated fictional Alabama football player, who had accepted a handshake from the President and was asked "how does it feel to be an All-American?". Winston Groom had been a freshman at the University of Alabama in 1961 during this era.)

Trammell was selected Academic All-American, was named the 1961 SEC Most Valuable Player, SEC Player of the Year, All-SEC (First Team) Back of 1961 season (AP, UPI) and All-SEC Academic Selection. He was voted as the 1961 Collegiate Player of the year by the Touchdown Club of Atlanta. He was chosen as the 1961 Most Valuable Back by the Birmingham Monday Morning Quarterback Club. He was chosen to receive the Most Valuable Player Award for 1961 by the Nashville Banner. He finished fifth in the voting for the Heisman Trophy, which was won by halfback Ernie Davis of Syracuse. Although the Birmingham Touchdown Club SEC player of the year award did not begin until 1979, he has been publicly honored and recognized by this organization on multiple occasions. By becoming the 1961 permanent Team Captain, Pat Trammell had his hand prints and cleat-prints stamped into the Walk of Fame in 1961 as "most outstanding player" on the ingress of Denny Chimes on the Quad at the University. This was the last time that this designation was ever made.

Several interviews of family members and players that knew him best gleaned some light on what made him so exceptional and "unbeatable". He had mastered the cognitive component of the fundamentals of the game by using his unique gifts of an eidetic "photographic" memory, "sixth sense" and "field presence". At any given moment during any play of any game, he knew how it was intended to unfold, not just for his position, but for every player on the field. He would have anticipated the next move of his opponents well before they knew it themselves and would often manipulate them into a more suitable position for his offense. Even when far outmatched, he would home in and exploit the weak link of the defense to leverage an upper hand. He welcomed adversity and would actually thrive on it. What Bryant found to be so amazing was that even though he was not a superior athlete, he was always able to find the necessary resources in the exact way at the exact time to overcome the odds, "make things happen" and deliver a win. Bryant would continue to build on this foundation for the rest of his career to turn average players with average skills into exceptional players who would believe in themselves and become winners both on and off the field. p. 88, p. 90

Teammate Billy Neighbors ('59–'61) would later say that Pat Trammell was the "smartest and best football player I'd ever played with .... period. And I played with some great players, like Bob Griese and Babe Parilli. Pat Trammell was still the smartest football player .... it was just the way he ran the team, the offense." p. 89

Butch Wilson ('59 - '62) knew Trammell well while they played together in the backfield. When later comparing him to his teammates in the NFL, such as Johnny Unitas and Fran Tarkenton, Wilson would say that Trammell was the toughest, most competitive quarterback with whom he had ever played. “They weren’t the caliber that Trammell was,” said Wilson. “They had a lot of ability, but it wasn’t that old hard-nosed style. He was almost like a lineman turned into a quarterback."

Incoming quarterback, Joe Namath, was heavily influenced by Trammell during their overlapping season of 1961. "Pat's leadership was exemplified by his toughness," said Namath. "He was a demanding mentor and certainly made me a better quarterback. I miss that smile of his."

Before the Draft, Vince Lombardi would pressure Coach Bryant to persuade Pat to come to play for him with the Green Bay Packers after graduation. Coach Bryant responded, "Pat is too smart to play professional football ... he will go on to medical school to fulfill his personal goals." Trammell majored in Chemical Engineering and Pre-Med and would graduate from the University of Alabama with the highest honors possibly attainable including the President's List, Phi Beta Kappa, summa cum laude and Jason's Men's Honor Society.  Of interest, he was drafted by the AFL Dallas Texans, but would never sign.

In one poll, the 1961 Alabama Team was voted as "the Best All-Time SEC football team" to ever play for the Southeastern Conference, and, in another, the third best college football team of all time. To have turned around a decade of losing streaks from scratch and collectively outscore their opponents 297 to 25, Coach Bryant and this team have been thought to have pioneered the revolutionary turning point for the modern day University of Alabama football championship dynasty. Coach Bryant would go on to win the National Coach of the Year Award for 1961, which was his first of three, as well as his first of eight awards for the SEC Coach of the Year. This would also be his first of six national championships, which were more than any other college football coach in history, until surpassed by Nick Saban in 2021.

Career statistics
Trammell set multiple records during his career at Alabama, mostly during his senior season. 1,314 total yards in a single season with 1,035 passing yards was, at the time, a school record. At the conclusion of his final season, he would hold the record as the winningest quarterback in the entire Crimson Tide history, compiling a 26–2–4 record for a .875 winning percentage as a starter. This record stood 33 years until it was broken by Jay Barker in 1994, with a 35–2–1 record for a .934 winning percentage. Jay Barker would be later awarded the prestigious Pat Trammell Award.

Currently, Trammell still holds two records at the university. Having thrown only two interceptions out of 133 passes in 1960 is currently the lowest interception percentage at just 1.5%, setting the single season record. He also holds the career record for lowest interception percentage, throwing only four out of 225 passes totaling 1.8%.

Death
Trammell died of complications from metastatic testicular cancer on December 10, 1968, at the age of 28 – only two years after earning his M.D. degree from the Medical College of Alabama, today's University of Alabama School of Medicine. He was completing a residency in dermatology and planned to continue practicing medicine as a third generation doctor. He left behind a wife and two young children.

Hundreds attended his funeral in Scottsboro; even Auburn University's head coach Ralph "Shug" Jordan put rivalry aside to attend the service. Condolences came in from around the state and country, including personal letters and telegrams from Alabama Governor George Wallace, Alabama Governor Albert Brewer, Alabama Governor Jim Folsom, Congressman Robert E. Jones Jr., Congressman Ben Cherner and President-elect Richard Nixon. A resolution from the Alabama House of Representatives was written into law on April 1, 1969, acknowledging the tragic loss and its impact on the populace of the state of Alabama.

The following is an excerpt from the eulogy at his funeral spoken by the then University President Dr. Frank Rose:

Afterward, with tears streaming down his face, tough, tenacious Paul "Bear" Bryant escorted Pat's mother out of the standing room only church in Scottsboro. This is reported to be the only time that Coach Bryant had ever been seen weeping in public.

In Bryant's autobiography The Bear, he stated that the day Pat died was "the saddest day of my life."

After Coach Bryant celebrated his 300th college football victory, in 1980, a reprint of an interview by author Clyde Bolton was published in The Birmingham News when he was reflecting back on his success as a football coach, leader and mentor.  During this interview he was put on the spot and asked if he had a "favorite player." Coach Bryant named off a number of players that he thought of highly during the previous 22 years at Alabama and during his 30 year coaching career. He took a pause at that point and said, "[now] You'll have to forgive me here for getting sentimental."  He then responded in turn with a deliberate answer to the question, " .... Pat Trammell was [not just my favorite player, but] the favorite person...... of my entire life."

Legacy 
The legacy of Pat Trammell has lived on since his death. His eventual influence and impact would be later brought to life in many non-fiction books, sports history books, documentaries, news articles and movies (one being The Bear, starring Gary Busey as Bear Bryant and Jon-Erik Hexum playing Trammell).

In 1965, upon completion of the Paul W. Bryant Hall for on-campus football player residence, the Pat Trammell Room was dedicated
In 1968, Trammell was elected as Alumni President of the University of Alabama letterman's A-Club, but would never serve due to his death.
In December of 1968, two weeks after his death, the Alabama A-Club Educational and Charitable Foundation was set in motion by teammates Tommy Brooker, James A. Sharpe, Joseph K. Sims, and Billy Neighbors. Coach Bryant and his teammates recognized the need for a charitable program that would lend support to the families and children of former University of Alabama football players in times of need, and to offer educational scholarships. An initial contribution of $1,000,000 in 1973 ($ in  dollars) was established by Coach Bryant with Trammell's family and children in mind. The Foundation has evolved into a world class charitable support system for the University of Alabama Department of Athletics that lives on today.
Beginning in 1970, Scottsboro High School implemented the annual Pat Trammell Award to the most outstanding scholar-athlete of the year to generate interest in becoming a future Academic All-American, as was Pat.
After the completion of the new football stadium in Scottsboro in 1971, it was named and dedicated as Trammell Stadium.
In 1975, Trammell was posthumously inducted into the Alabama Sports Hall of Fame.
In 2009, the theatrical performance of Bear Country starring Rodney Clark as Coach Bryant, drew unexpected popularity. During the true to life play, Coach Bryant is approaching retirement and reflects back over his life and career. Recent interest has been drawn, that, of the hundreds of players that he had coached and known so well over 45 years, he would only mention one by name. A dramatic and emotional scene in the play about his inner regard for Trammell ensued. It has been said that losing Pat ended up being so emotionally devastating for Coach Bryant that it was as if he had lost his own son.
On November 1, 2014, Pat Trammell was inducted into the Jackson County Sports Hall Fame as an inaugural member.
Beginning in 2008, a Sports Medicine Fellowship and Chair in recognition of Dr. Pat Trammell have been endowed at the University of Alabama School of Medicine, Tuscaloosa Campus, between the College of Community Health Sciences and the Department of Intercollegiate Athletics. As described by the Athletic Director Emeritus,  the late Mal Moore, "the Dr. Patrick Lee Trammell Sr., Excellence in Sports Medicine Program promotes specialized Sports Medicine education, on-the-field 'hands-on' training, and practical experience for future Sports Medicine Team Physicians." The first resident physician was awarded the fellowship and entered the program in June 2010.

Recipients of the endowed Dr. Patrick Lee Trammell Sr., Sports Medicine Fellowship 
2010 - Dr. Ray Stewart
2011 - Dr. Eric Law
2012 - Dr. Zach Boylan and Dr. Brent Smith
2013 - Dr. Scott Boyken
2014 - Dr. Blake Perry and Dr. Jeremy Latron Coleman
2015 - Dr. Hunter Russell and Dr. Matt Andres
2016 - Dr. Brett Bentley
2017 - Dr. Keirsten Smith
2018 - Dr. Michael Bradburn and Dr. Aloiya Earl
2019 - Dr. Russ Guin and Dr. Tom Bollaert
2020 - Dr. Matt Gilbert, Dr. Rudy Harrison and Dr. Hajat Avdovic
2021 - Dr. Morgan Benefield and Dr. Joseph Garcia

Annual Pat Trammell Award, of the University of Alabama Football Program 
The Pat Trammell Award is presented by the University of Alabama Alumni Association and Department of Athletics to an outstanding Alabama football player who demonstrates the qualities of Integrity, Character, Importance of Academics and Inspirational Leadership that are representative of Trammell himself. The following is the partial list of recipients: 

1988 - David Smith
1989 - John Mangum
1990 - Roger Shultz
1991 - Kevin Turner
1992 - George Wilson
1993 - Tobie Sheils
1994 - Jay Barker
1995 - John Walters
1996 - John Causey
1997 - Curtis Alexander
1998 - John David Phillips
1999 - Shaun Alexander
2000 - Paul Hogan
2001 - Andrew Zow
2002 - Sam Collins
2004 - Antonio Carter
2005 - Matt Miller
2006 - Tim Castille
2007 - Keith Saunders and Matt Caddell
2008 - Bobby Greenwood and Travis McCall
2009 - Drew Davis and Cory Reamer
2010 - Preston Dial and David Ross
2011 - Alex Watkins and Alfred McCullough
2012 - Michael Williams and Nico Johnson
2013 - Deion Belue and Kellen Williams
2014 - Brian Vogler and Brandon Ivory
2015 - Denzel Devall and Richard Mullaney
2016 - Gehrig Dieter and Dalvin Tomlinson
2017 - Robert Foster and J. C. Hassenauer
2018 - Joshua Casher and Jamey Mosley
2019 - Shyheim Carter and Jared Mayden
2020 - Thomas Fletcher, Josua McMillon, Chris Owens, Jaylen Waddle
2021 - Jalyn Armour-Davis, Kendall Randolph, LaBryan Ray

See also
 Alabama Crimson Tide football yearly statistical leaders

Video
You Tube – Pat Trammell, Alabama national championship QB remembered

References

External links
 Alabama Sports Hall of Fame profile
 Encyclopedia of Alabama entry
 College statistics at Sports Reference
 

1940 births
1968 deaths
American football quarterbacks
Alabama Crimson Tide football players
University of Alabama School of Medicine alumni
People from Scottsboro, Alabama
Players of American football from Alabama
Deaths from testicular cancer
Deaths from cancer in Alabama